The Yallourn Power Station, now owned by EnergyAustralia a wholly owned subsidiary of the Hong-Kong-based CLP Group, is located in the Latrobe Valley of Victoria, Australia, beside the Latrobe River, with the company town of Yallourn located to the south west. Yallourn PS was a complex of six brown coalfired thermal power stations built progressively from the 1920s to the 1960s; all except one have now been decommissioned. Today, only the  Yallourn W plant remains. It is the second largest power station in Victoria, supplying 22% of Victoria's electricity and 8% of the National Electricity Market. The adjacent open cut brown coal mine is the largest open cut coal mine in Australia, with reserves sufficient to meet the projected needs of the power station to 2028. On 10 March 2021, EnergyAustralia announced that it will close the Yallourn Power Station in mid-2028, four years ahead of schedule, and instead build a 350 megawatt battery in the Latrobe Valley by the end of 2026. At the time, Yallourn produced about 20% of Victoria's electricity.

Yallourn A, B, C, D and E

Power generation at Yallourn was first proposed in 1919 when the Victorian Government appointed a committee to investigate the use of coal from the Latrobe Valley. The plant was operated by the State Electricity Commission of Victoria, and the first sod was turned at the Yallourn Power Station site in 1921. Along with the power station, the town of Yallourn was constructed nearby to house workers of the plant. Coal was moved from the open cut mine to the power station by the Yallourn 900mm Railway, a narrow gauge electric railway running along temporary tracks in the mine. The Morwell Interconnecting Railway was later provided to the Morwell power station and briquette works for the transfer of Yallourn coal to the briquette works, as Morwell mine (now called Hazelwood mine) coal did not briquette satisfactorily.

In the complex, Yallourn A was the first plant opened in 1928. "A" station consisted of 6 Metro Vickers sets each 12.5MW.

Yallourn B entering service on 11 April 1932. B station consisted of 4 Metro Vickers sets of 25MW. Steam was supplied by 10 John Thompson chain grate boilers each producing 120,000 lb/hr at 260PSI and 670 °F. Yallourn A was demolished in 1968, and Yallourn B following in the early 1970s. Yallourn C, D and E stations were commissioned in 1954, 1957 and 1961 respectively, and provided the bulk of Victoria's power until Hazelwood Power Station became operational in the mid 1960s. Yallourn A, B, C & D were constructed as 'range'-type power stations that connected individual boilers to a common steam range before connecting to the turbine.

C station had 2 turbo alternators, each . Steam was supplied by 6 pulverized coal burning water tube boilers. D station was exactly the same as C station.

E station had 2 units, each  with hydrogen cooled generators but no stator water cooling. Yallourn E was the first unitised station constructed in the complex, as each boiler was paired with its own turbine.

Yallourn E station ceased generating power in January 1989, with C, D and E plants being demolished from 1995 onwards, with the site being cleared by 1999. The narrow gauge railway in the mine was replaced by conveyor belts in 1984, and the Morwell Interconnecting Railway was replaced by road haulage in 1993.

Briquette factory
In conjunction with the power station, the open cut mine also fed a briquette factory operated by the SECV. The plant closed in 1970, after the discovery and reticulation of natural gas in Victoria which led to the closure of the major Lurgi briquette gasification plant in Morwell. Remaining demand for briquettes was met by the Morwell briquette factory that was opened in 1959. It was shut down in 2014.

Yallourn W

The current Yallourn W power station was built in the 1970s at Yallourn West. The four units are Toshiba built 3 stage reheat turbines with steam supplied by four 'subcritical' pulverized coal-fired boilers. In 1969 it was announced that the town of Yallourn would be demolished to enable an expansion of the coal mine, with demolition commencing in the 1970s and completed by 1982. Yallourn W power station was the second Victorian generating entity to be privatised in 1996 when it was sold to a consortium including PowerGen, Itochu, AMP, Hastings and NSW State Super. The plant is currently owned by Hong Kong-based CLP and operates under the EnergyAustralia brand (formally TRUenergy).

With the coal supply from Yallourn's East Field mine expected to be exhausted in 2007, work commenced on a diversion of the nearby Morwell River in 2002 to enable access to further coal sources from the Maryvale coal field. Without this, the power station potentially faced significant modification or even closure. The Morwell River Diversion, and the access to coal supplies it allows, will ensure Yallourn can continue to operate until 2032. The  diversion was constructed over five years at a cost of A$122 million, and came in on time and on budget. On 6 June 2012, a levee bank failure resulted in the flooding of the Yallourn coal mine causing damage to its infrastructure and cutting fuel supply to the power station.

In 2007 the station's name was shortened to be "Yallourn Power Station". In late 2007, a subsidence in the mine wall resulted in the Latrobe River bursting through, damaging coal conveying plant and flooding low levels of the mine. Urgent earthwork repairs were made with the co-operation of other power generators. Coal production was limited for some weeks.

Carbon Monitoring for Action estimates this power station emits  of greenhouse gases each year as a result of burning coal. The Australian Government announced the introduction of a Carbon Pollution Reduction Scheme commencing in 2010 to help combat climate change. It is expected to impact on emissions from power stations. The National Pollutant Inventory provides details of other pollutant emissions, but not CO2.

During 2018 and 2019, the station had 37 outages.

Fire
On 21 June 2013 a fire broke out in a control panel causing three units to trip. This multi-unit contingency caused a "Pricing Event" on the National Electricity Market, and the Market Operator reported the event as part of an industrial action campaign. Police later announced their finding that the event was an act of sabotage.

Closure announcement
On 10 March 2021, it was announced that the closure date for Yallourn W had been revised from 2032 to 2028 due to low wholesale electricity prices as well as rising operating costs. A 350MW battery is set to be completed by 2026.

Engineering heritage award
The power station site is listed as an Engineering Heritage National Landmark by Engineers Australia as part of its Engineering Heritage Recognition Program.

Popular culture

In 1934, Jessie Deakin Brookes wore a costume for the Pageant of Nations celebrating the centenary of Victoria, created by Thelma Thomas. It featured three Melbourne buildings, the Murray Darling river and irrigation system and its headpiece was modelled on the Yallourn power station transmission tower. It was the inspiration of the exhibition Velvet, Iron, Ashes at the State Library in Victoria in 2019-2020.

See also

 The Power Makers, a 1957 short documentary about the power station
 List of power stations in Victoria
 List of coal-fired power stations in Australia

References

External links

 EnergyAustralia

Coal-fired power stations in Victoria (Australia)
Gippsland (region)
Recipients of Engineers Australia engineering heritage markers
1928 establishments in Australia